Social Cognitive and Affective Neuroscience is a monthly peer-reviewed scientific journal covering social neuroscience published by Oxford University Press. Its focus is on empirical research reports. According to the Journal Citation Reports, the journal has a 2021 impact factor of 4.235.

References

External links

Neuroscience journals
Publications established in 2006
English-language journals
Monthly journals
Oxford University Press academic journals